Tolbo (Stain) is a sum (district) of Bayan-Ölgii Province in western Mongolia. It is primarily inhabited by ethnic Kazakhs. As of 2014 it had a population of 3939 people.

A large saline lake, Tolbo Lake, is located in the district, just north of the sum center. The lake was the site of the Battle of Tolbo Lake (1921) during the Russian Civil War where Bolsheviks and Mongolian allies defeated an army of White Russians.

References 

Populated places in Mongolia
Districts of Bayan-Ölgii Province